Northern Subdivision may refer to:
Northern Subdivision (Pennsylvania), formerly B&O
Northern Subdivision (CSX), formerly C&O, connecting Kentucky to Columbus, Ohio